Manuel Colón (born 18 February 1977) is a Spanish handball player. He competed in the men's tournament at the 2004 Summer Olympics.

He was a part of the clubs including Reale Ademar Leon (1995 - 2006), BM Altea (2006 - 2007) and BM Alcobendas (2007 - 2009).

References

1977 births
Living people
Spanish male handball players
Olympic handball players of Spain
Handball players at the 2004 Summer Olympics
Sportspeople from Madrid
Handball players from the Community of Madrid